Harrisburg High School may refer to:

 Harrisburg High School (Arkansas), located in Harrisburg, Arkansas
 Harrisburg High School (Illinois), located in Harrisburg, Illinois
 Harrisburg High School (Missouri), located in Harrisburg, Missouri
 Harrisburg High School (Oregon), located in Harrisburg, Oregon
 Harrisburg High School (Pennsylvania), located in Harrisburg, Pennsylvania
 Harrisburg Technical High School, located in Harrisburg, Pennsylvania
 Harrisburg High School (South Dakota), located in Harrisburg, South Dakota

See also
Harrisburg School